Vergiate is a comune (municipality) in the Province of Varese in the Italian region Lombardy, located about 45 km northwest of Milan and about 15 km southwest of Varese. As of 31 December 2018 it had a population of 8,716

Vergiate borders the following municipalities: Arsago Seprio, Casale Litta, Comabbio, Golasecca, Mercallo, Mornago, Sesto Calende, Somma Lombardo, Varano Borghi.

People
Giorgio Locatelli, chef and expatriate in England. He and Andrew Graham-Dixon are known for their Sicily Unpacked and Italy Unpacked television series.
Enrico Baj, Italian writer and artist. He moved in the late 1950s in Vergiate and died there in 2003. The city has also a square dedicated to him.

References

External links
 Official website

Cities and towns in Lombardy